All Mistakes Buried (formerly known as The Aftermath) is a 2015 crime drama film written and directed by Tim McCann, also written by Shaun Sanghani and Sam Trammell. The film stars Sam Trammell and Vanessa Ferlito. It was produced by Shaun Sanghani (SSS Entertainment). It had its world premiere at the Dances With Films Festival and is being distributed in the United States by Breaking Glass Pictures.

Premise
A lone, struggling addict takes on a dangerous underground criminal ring in his small Southern town to retrieve a stolen pendant he believes will save his marriage.

Cast
Sam Trammell as Sonny
Vanessa Ferlito as Franki
Nick Loeb as Nick
Missy Yager as Jennifer

Production
Principal photography of the film took place on August, 2013 in Alexandria, Louisiana, United States. Movie was shot in 12 days.

Release
All Mistakes Buried premiered on May 31, 2015 at the Dances With Films Festival. It was released theatrically and on video on demand in North America on January 22, 2016.

Reception

Critical response

Accolades

See also

References

External links

2015 films
2015 crime thriller films
2015 crime drama films
2015 psychological thriller films
American crime drama films
Films directed by Tim McCann
2010s English-language films
2010s American films